Katarína Šimoňáková (born 31 January 1998) is a Slovak luger. She competed in the women's singles event at the 2018 Winter Olympics.

References

External links
 

1998 births
Living people
Slovak female lugers
Olympic lugers of Slovakia
Lugers at the 2018 Winter Olympics
Lugers at the 2022 Winter Olympics
Sportspeople from Spišská Nová Ves
Lugers at the 2016 Winter Youth Olympics